William Carl "Bama" Warwick (born October 27, 1917, Birmingham, Alabama - died 2003, Philadelphia) was an American jazz trumpeter.

Warwick lived in Brookside, Alabama as a child, then moved in with Charlie Shavers after moving northward in the early 1930s. Together, they moved to Philadelphia in 1936 and became members of Frank Fairfax's band, playing alongside Dizzy Gillespie. They subsequently played with Tiny Bradshaw and the Mills Blue Rhythm Band. After Shavers left to join John Kirby's ensemble, Warwick worked with Teddy Hill, Edgar Hayes, Don Redman, and Bunny Berigan.

During World War II, Warwick conducted a military band. He played with Woody Herman in 1944-45, then worked with Buddy Rich. In the 1950s he led his own group and also worked with Lucky Millinder and Brew Moore; he returned to Gillespie's employ in 1956, playing intermittently with him until 1961. He took a position directing music with the New York City Department of Corrections in 1966. In 1972, he appeared at the Newport Jazz Festival with Benny Carter.

References
Barry Kernfeld, "Carl Warwick". The New Grove Dictionary of Jazz. 2nd edition.

American jazz trumpeters
American male trumpeters
1917 births
2003 deaths
20th-century trumpeters
Jazz musicians from Alabama
20th-century American male musicians
American male jazz musicians
Mills Blue Rhythm Band members